John James Audubon Bridge may refer to:

 John James Audubon Bridge (Ohio River), a bridge connecting Kentucky and Indiana, United States
 John James Audubon Bridge (Mississippi River), a bridge in Louisiana, United States